The list of shipwrecks in March 1887 includes ships sunk, foundered, grounded, or otherwise lost during March 1887.

1 March

2 March

3 March

4 March

5 March

6 March

8 March

9 March

10 March

11 March

15 March

16 March

20 March

21 March

22 March

23 March

24 March

25 March

27 March

28 March

29 March

31 March

Unknown date

References

1887-03
Maritime incidents in March 1887